The 1986 San Francisco Giants season was the Giants' 104th season in Major League Baseball, their 29th season in San Francisco since their move from New York following the 1957 season, and their 27th at Candlestick Park. The team finished in third place in the National League West with an 83–79 record, 13 games behind the Houston Astros.

Offseason
 October 24, 1985: George Riley and Alonzo Powell were traded by the Giants to the Montreal Expos for Bill Laskey.
 December 11, 1985: Manny Trillo was traded by the Giants to the Chicago Cubs for Dave Owen.
 December 17, 1985: Vida Blue was signed as a free agent by the Giants.
 December 18, 1985: Rob Deer was traded by the Giants to the Milwaukee Brewers for Dean Freeland (minors) and Eric Pilkington (minors).
 January 23, 1986: Fran Mullins was purchased from the Giants by the Cleveland Indians.
 February 3, 1986: Rick Waits was signed as a free agent by the Giants.
 March 26, 1986: Steve Stanicek was traded by the Giants to the Milwaukee Brewers for Rob DeWolf (minors).

Regular season
 April 8, 1986: In his first major league at bat, Will Clark debuted with a home run— in his first at-bat and on his first swing off of future Hall of Fame member Nolan Ryan. Clark became the 11th player in history to hit a home run on his first swing in the Major Leagues. 
 August 5, 1986: Steve Carlton struck out Eric Davis for the 4000th strikeout of his career.
 September 21, 1986: Robby Thompson went 5 for 5 in a game versus the Atlanta Braves.

On August 20, 1986, Phillies pitcher Don Carman took a perfect game into the ninth inning against the Giants at Candlestick Park. Giants catcher Bob Brenly hit a long drive into the gap in left-center field. Phillies center fielder Milt Thompson was positioned to make a running catch but the ball hit the base of his glove and was ruled a hit. Brenly was credited with a double. Carman lost the perfect game but the Phillies won in ten innings.

Opening Day starters
Bob Brenly
Chris Brown
Will Clark
Chili Davis
Dan Gladden
Mike Krukow
Jeffrey Leonard
Robby Thompson
José Uribe

Season standings

Record vs. opponents

Notable transactions
 June 2, 1986: 1986 Major League Baseball draft
Matt Williams was drafted by the Giants in the 1st round (3rd pick).
Kirt Manwaring was drafted by the Giants in the 2nd round. Player signed June 4, 1986.
Jim Pena was drafted by the San Francisco Giants in the 16th round.
 July 4, 1986: Steve Carlton was signed as a free agent by the Giants.
 August 7, 1986: Steve Carlton was released by the Giants.

Major League debuts
Batters: 
Mike Aldrete (May 28)  
Will Clark (Apr 8)  
Randy Kutcher (Jun 19)  
Phil Ouellette (Sep 10)  
Robby Thompson (Apr 8)  
Pitchers: 
Randy Bockus (Sep 10)  
Kelly Downs (Jul 29)  
Chuck Hensley (May 10)  
Terry Mulholland (Jun 8)

Roster

Player stats

Batting

Starters by position
Note: Pos = Position; G = Games played; AB = At bats; H = Hits; Avg. = Batting average; HR = Home runs; RBI = Runs batted in

Other batters
Note: G = Games played; AB = At bats; H = Hits; Avg. = Batting average; HR = Home runs; RBI = Runs batted in

Pitching

Starting pitchers 
Note: G = Games pitched; IP = Innings pitched; W = Wins; L = Losses; ERA = Earned run average; SO = Strikeouts

Other pitchers 
Note: G = Games pitched; IP = Innings pitched; W = Wins; L = Losses; ERA = Earned run average; SO = Strikeouts

Relief pitchers 
Note: G = Games pitched; W = Wins; L = Losses; SV = Saves; ERA = Earned run average; SO = Strikeouts

Awards and honors
 Mike Krukow, P, Willie Mac Award
  Candy Maldonado – Led National League in Pinch Hitting (.425 Batting average, 17 for 40, 4 Home Runs, 20 RBI)

All-Star Game
 Chris Brown, outfield, reserve

Farm system

References

External links
 1986 San Francisco Giants at Baseball Reference
 1986 San Francisco Giants at Baseball Almanac

San Francisco Giants seasons
San Francisco Giants season
San
1986 in sports